The Five Cents of Lavarede (French:Les cinq sous de Lavarède) is a 1913 French silent adventure film directed by Henri Andréani and starring Suzanne Goldstein and Godeau.

References

Bibliography 
 Goble, Alan. The Complete Index to Literary Sources in Film. Walter de Gruyter, 1999.

External links 
 

1913 films
French silent films
French adventure films
1913 adventure films
1910s French-language films
Films directed by Henri Andréani
French black-and-white films
Silent adventure films
1910s French films